Jemal Rezovich Gubaz (born 2 September 1968, in Gudauta) is a former football player from Abkhazia and a former Chairman of the Football Federation of Abkhazia.

Chairman of the Football Federation of Abkhazia
In March 2012, Jemal Gubaz was elected to succeed Leonid Dzapshba as Chairman of the Football Federation of Abkhazia.

On 8 September 2015, the FFA announced that the upcoming leadership election had been moved forward to October from the Spring of 2016, so as to leave more time for the preparation of the 2016 ConIFA World Football Cup, hosted by Abkhazia. Gubaz was initially running for re-election, but announced on 21 September his immediate resignation, leaving the field clear for Ruslan Ajinjal to be elected unanimously.

On 27 October, Gubaz explained in an interview that he had called the early election after President Raul Khajimba had expressed his support for his work, but that he stepped down when he heard that Khajimba in fact supported Ajinjal's candidacy, because he "didn't play such games".

References

External links
 

1968 births
People from Gudauta
Living people
Soviet footballers
Russian footballers
Association football midfielders
Russian Premier League players
FC Dinamo Sukhumi players
FC Dinamo Tbilisi players
FC SKA Rostov-on-Don players
FC Rostov players
FC Anzhi Makhachkala players